Odelín Molina Hernández (born 3 August 1974) is a Cuban former footballer who played as a goalkeeper for FC Villa Clara and Antiguan side Parham.

He is the Cuba national team's second most capped player of all-time, behind Yénier Márquez.

Club career
Born in Santa Clara, Molina played club football for his provincial team FC Villa Clara. He played the 2016–17 season at Parham in Antigua and Barbuda alongside compatriots Jaime Colomé and Hensy Muñoz and Jaime's brother Yoel Colomé.

International career
Molina made his international debut for Cuba in a May 1996 FIFA World Cup qualification match against the Cayman Islands and has earned a total of 122 caps. including 28 FIFA World Cup qualifying matches. He also played at six CONCACAF Gold Cup final tournaments.

His final international was a July 2013 CONCACAF Gold Cup match against Panama, after he announced he would retire from international football after the tournament.

Honours
Cuba
 Caribbean Cup: 2012

See also
 List of men's footballers with 100 or more international caps

References

External links
 

1974 births
Living people
People from Santa Clara, Cuba
Cuban footballers
Association football goalkeepers
Cuba international footballers
FIFA Century Club
2002 CONCACAF Gold Cup players
2003 CONCACAF Gold Cup players
2005 CONCACAF Gold Cup players
2007 CONCACAF Gold Cup players
2011 CONCACAF Gold Cup players
2013 CONCACAF Gold Cup players
Antigua and Barbuda Premier Division players
FC Villa Clara players
Parham F.C. players
Cuban expatriate footballers
Expatriate footballers in Antigua and Barbuda
Cuban expatriate sportspeople in Antigua and Barbuda